Loryma callos is a species of snout moth in the genus Loryma. It was described by Pierre Viette in 1973, and is known from Zimbabwe and has also been found in Madagascar.

References

Moths described in 1973
Pyralini
Moths of Madagascar
Moths of Africa